Pandit Makhanlal Chaturvedi (4 April 1889 – 30 January 1968), also called Pandit ji, was an Indian poet, writer, essayist, playwright and a journalist who is particularly remembered for his participation in India's national struggle for independence and his contribution to Chhayavaad, the Neo-romanticism movement of Hindi literature. He was awarded the first Sahitya Akademi Award in Hindi for his work Him Tarangini in 1955. The Government of India awarded him the civilian honour of the Padma Bhushan in 1963. For his works reinforcing Indian nationalism during the British Raj, he is referred to as the Yug Charan.

Early life
Chaturvedi was born in a Babai village of Narmadapuram district of Madhya Pradesh on 4 April 1889. He became a schoolteacher when he was aged 16. Later, he was the editor of the nationalist journals  Prabha, Pratap and Karmaveer, and was repeatedly incarcerated during the British Raj. After the Indian independence, he refrained from seeking a position in the government, instead continuing to speak and write against social evils and in support of an exploitation-free, equitable society as envisioned by Mahatma Gandhi.

Literary career
His noted works are Him Kirtini, Him Tarangini, Yug Charan, and Sahitya Devata, and his most noted poems are Venu Lo Gunje Dhara, Deep Se Deep Jale, Kaisa Chhand Banaa Deti hai, Agnipath and Pushp ki Abhilaashaa.

Legacy
In his memory, the Madhya Pradesh Sahitya Akademi (Madhya Pradesh Cultural Council) organizes the annual 'Makhanlal Chaturvedi Samaroh', since 1987, besides awarding the annual 'Makhanlal Chaturvedi Puraskar' for excellence in poetry by an Indian poet.

The Makhanlal Chaturvedi Rashtriya Patrakarita Vishwavidyalaya at Bhopal in Madhya Pradesh has been named in his honour.

See also
 Makhanlal Chaturvedi National University of Journalism and Communication

References

External links
 Makhanlal Chaturvedi at Kavita Kosh (Hindi)
 

Recipients of the Sahitya Akademi Award in Hindi
Indian male journalists
Hindi-language poets
Hindi-language writers
1889 births
1968 deaths
People from Hoshangabad
Recipients of the Padma Bhushan in literature & education
20th-century Indian poets
Indian male poets
Journalists from Madhya Pradesh
Poets from Madhya Pradesh
20th-century Indian male writers